Pandea is a genus of hydrozoans of the family Pandeidae.

Species
The World Register of Marine Species recognises the following species: 
Pandea clionis (Vanhöffen, 1910)
Pandea conica (Quoy & Gaimard, 1827)
Pandea cybeles Alvariño, 1988
Pandea rubra Bigelow, 1913

Invalid species 
 Pandea minima von Lendenfeld, 1885 [taxon inquirendum]

References

Pandeidae
Hydrozoan genera